Aníbal Cavaco Silva served as Prime Minister of Portugal from November 1985 to October 1995. He became Prime Minister after serving as President of the Conservative Social Democratic Party (PSD) since May 1985. For almost all of his 10 years as Prime Minister, Cavaco Silva ruled in cohabitation with President Mário Soares (which came from the centre-left Socialist Party). The 10-year period during which Cavaco Silva led the government is often dubbed Cavaquismo in Portuguese, which could be translated as Cavacoism .

The decade in power of Cavaco Silva was mostly marked by robust economic growth and socio-economic development which allowed for the modernization of the economy and an unprecedented convergence of the Portuguese GDP per capita and standards of living with the average of Western Europe. Led by Cavaco Silva, PSD achieved its first absolute majority in the 1987 election and a second one in 1991. Cavaco Silva's third term in office (1991–95) was not as successful: from 1992 to 1995 Portugal endured an economic crisis (owing to the effects of the cambial crisis of the European Exchange Rate Mechanism). The third government of Cavaco Silva was also marked by highly controversial measures such as a significant hike in university tuition fees (which led to major student protests), the 50% increase in the toll fees of 25 de Abril Bridge (which led to one of the biggest demonstrations since 25 de Abril revolution, the blockade of the Bridge on 24 June 1994) and the continuation of construction of the controversial Foz Côa Dam. Economic growth resumed in 1995, but the relationship of Portuguese people with Cavaco Silva was not the same that had given him an absolute majority four years before.

In February 1995, Cavaco Silva stepped down as leader of PSD and chose not to run for a fourth term as Prime Minister in the October 1995 parliamentary election, remaining silent about a candidacy for President of Portugal in the January 1996 presidential election. Cavaco Silva's Minister of Defense Fernando Nogueira was chosen to succeed him as leader of PSD and to lead the party in the parliamentary election. Nogueira-led PSD lost the parliamentary election to the Socialist Party and António Guterres became Prime Minister. In October 1995, Cavaco Silva announced he would be candidate in the 1996 presidential election. He eventually lost the election to Socialist Jorge Sampaio. Cavaco Silva retired from politics for a decade: he contested and won the 2006 presidential election becoming President of Portugal. He was re-elected in 2011, serving as President of Portugal from 2006 to 2016.

X - XI - XII Constitutional Governments

The first Cabinet was sworn in on 6 November 1985, with parliamentary minority; the second on 17 August 1987, and the last on 31 October 1991, both with absolute majority. The former would last until 28 October 1995.

References

Government of Portugal